José Vicente Castaño Gil aka El Profe (born July 2, 1957) is a former leader of the United Self-Defense Forces of Colombia (AUC), a right-wing Colombian paramilitary organization. After demobilizing, he was accused of murdering his brother and former AUC leader Carlos Castaño and of narcotics trafficking by both the Colombian government and the government of the United States.  In August 2004, the United States formally requested his extradition. Castaño remains, however, a fugitive and is the presumed chief of the criminal organization Águilas Negras  made up of former AUC paramilitary members.

Biography

Early life
Castaño was born July 2, 1957 in Amalfi, a small village in the Antioquia Department in central Colombia. He was the sixth among twelve siblings of a family of farmers. When he was 12 years old he  dropped out from school to help his father on farming duties. At the age of 18 years he left the village and went to neighboring Venezuela where he also worked on farming for two years. Back in Colombia, Castaño worked with his brother Fidel Castaño in many businesses including a pub, gold exchange in Segovia, Antioquia, and farming. They later moved to Medellín where they worked in the lottery business.

Father's death
Castaño's father died on September 18, 1981 at the hands of the FARC-EP, a leftist rebel organization. The FARC had kidnapped the elder Castaño and demanded a ransom of 150 million pesos.

Family
Vicente Castaño is the brother of Fidel Castaño, a leader of Los Pepes and the founder of Peasant Self-Defenders of Córdoba and Urabá and Carlos Castaño Gil, who led the AUC until his death. Vicente has been accused of ordering Carlos' death.

Possible death
Several sources claim that Castaño was assassinated under the orders of Diego Murillo Bejarano in retaliation for taking controls of territory and criminal rackets.

Popular culture 
 In TV series El Cartel is portrayed by an anonymous actor as the character of Leopoldo Aguilar.
 In colombian TV series Tres Caínes is portrayed by the colombian actor Elkin Díaz.

References

External links
 Colombian Air Force - Attorney will investigate Jose Vicente Castaño for the death of his brother Carlos
 Semana.com - ¿Quién es Vicente Castaño?

1957 births
Colombian drug traffickers
Colombian murderers
Fugitives wanted by Colombia
Fugitives wanted on murder charges
Members of the United Self-Defense Forces of Colombia
Possibly living people